Spas-Yamshchiki is a rural locality (a selo) in Staroselskoye Rural Settlement, Mezhdurechensky District, Vologda Oblast, Russia. The population was 2 as of 2002. There are 5 streets.

Geography 
Spas-Yamshchiki is located 25 km southwest of Shuyskoye (the district's administrative centre) by road. Sovka is the nearest rural locality.

References 

Rural localities in Mezhdurechensky District, Vologda Oblast